Villette or Villettes may refer to:

People
Arthur Villettes, (fl. 1746–1765), British diplomat
Francois Villette (1621-1698), engineer, optician and fireworks expert at the court of Louis XIV of France
Pierre Villette (1926–1998), French composer
Rétaux de Villette (1759–1797), French forger

Places

France
Ernemont-la-Villette, in the Seine-Maritime département
La Villette, Calvados
Muille-Villette, in the Somme département
Les Villettes, in the Haute-Loire département
Villette-d'Anthon, in the Isère département
Villette-de-Vienne, in the Isère département
Villette-lès-Arbois, in the Jura département
Villette-lès-Dole, in the Jura département
Villette, Meurthe-et-Moselle
Villette-sur-Ain, in the Ain département
Villette-sur-Aube, in the Aube département
Villettes, in the Eure département
Villette, Yvelines
Villette (Savoy)

Paris
Barrière de la Villette, on the Place de Stalingrad
Bassin de la Villette, the largest artificial lake in Paris
Château Villette, a manor
La Villette, Seine, a French commune annexed by Paris in 1860
Parc de la Villette, a.k.a. La Villette, an area in Paris, known for the Cité des Sciences et de l'Industrie science museum
Grande halle de la Villette, a cultural center within the Parc de la Villette
Porte de la Villette (Paris Métro)

Other
Villette (Charleroi Metro), Belgium
Villette, Piedmont, in the province of Verbano-Cusio-Ossola, Italy
Villette, Vaud, a commune in the canton of Vaud, Switzerland

Other uses
La Villette Charleroi, a Belgian table tennis club
Villette (novel), by Charlotte Brontë, published in 1853